Paul McDonald (born 27 April 1956) is a former Australian rules footballer who played with Essendon in the Victorian Football League (VFL). He later played for Subiaco in the West Australian Football League (WAFL) and Victorian Football Association (VFA) sides Prahran and Port Melbourne.

Notes

External links 		
		

Essendon Football Club past player profile
WAFL statistics
		
		
		

Living people
1956 births
Australian rules footballers from Victoria (Australia)		
Essendon Football Club players
Keilor Football Club players
Subiaco Football Club players
Prahran Football Club players
Port Melbourne Football Club players